The lesser palatine canals (also accessory palatine canals) are passages in the palatine bone that carry the lesser and middle palatine nerves and vessels.

Structure
The lesser palatine canals start from the greater palatine canal, and run with them, also opening into the roof of the oral cavity.  Their openings are known as the lesser palatine foramina, and they transmit the lesser palatine artery, vein, and nerve, as well as the middle palatine vessels and nerve.

See also
 Pterygopalatine fossa

References

Bones of the head and neck

ro:Canale palatine mici